Struck by Lightning is a 2012 American coming-of-age comedy-drama film directed by Brian Dannelly and written by and starring Chris Colfer. The film had its world premiere at the Tribeca Film Festival on 21 April 2012, and was released theatrically on 11 January 2013. It features the final screen appearance of actress Polly Bergen.

On 20 November 2012, Colfer released a young adult novel based on the film, titled Struck by Lightning: The Carson Phillips Journal.

The film received mixed reviews with criticism going to the character of Carson, but praised the performances of the cast and Colfer’s screenplay.

Plot
High school senior Carson Phillips is struck and killed by lightning. The film is a flashback of recent events of his life. Carson has plans to go to Northwestern University to become an editor for The New Yorker, but has been unsuccessful in making the dreams happen.

During a writer's club meeting, Malerie Baggs asks Carson for advice about her writing. Carson says that she cannot find the ideas, the ideas have to find her. He goes to a student council meeting run by head cheerleader Claire Matthews . Everyone in student council ignores him because of his objections to their ideas. As Carson's mother Sheryl is picking up prescriptions, she makes small talk with the new pharmacist April Adams, who is pregnant and Carson's future step mother. Carson also visits his grandmother, but she does not know who he is due to Alzheimer's disease.

As Carson is finishing up the school paper at night, he catches wealthy student Nicholas Forbes and the drama club president Scott Thomas kissing. Nicholas begs Carson not to tell anyone of his homosexuality. Carson agrees on the condition that they will contribute to the paper until they both graduate.

Carson's father, Neal, and April visit a lawyer to straighten out legal issues. April, who is unaware about Carson or Sheryl, storms out when she learns Neal is still legally married and has a child.

Carson's guidance counselor informs him that to improve his chances of getting into Northwestern, he needs to submit to a literary magazine. He gets permission to start the magazine from his principal . He announces at a school assembly that all entries will be taken, but later finds the submission box filled with nothing but trash. When Malerie suggests that others will join because Carson convinced Scott and Nicholas to write for the school paper, Carson tells her the real reason behind their participation. She reveals that she caught Claire having sex with Coach Walker, who is the brother of her boyfriend, Justin. Malerie says that everyone in their school probably has an embarrassing secret that they would not want exposed.

Sheryl meets April filling a prescription. April recognizes Carson's name on the anti-depressant prescription. She goes home to Neal and demands to meet his son. During the homecoming parade, Carson is forced to pull the writer's club float after the cheerleaders take the car he was assigned. Feeling more humiliated, Carson blackmails several of his peers into writing for his literary magazine. Together, he and Malerie blackmail fellow school paper members Dwayne, yearbook president Remy Baker, Vicki, and a supposed foreign exchange student Emilio (Roberto Aguire).

During a meeting with the other students and Coach Walker, Carson extorts agreements that everyone must offer something to put in the magazine if they want their secrets to stay quiet. Carson also tells Claire and Coach Walker that they must have each cheerleader and football player submit something, as a way to make the issue more popular among the student body.

After school, Carson gets a call from Neal, who tells him about April and the baby. He wants them to get together soon. During dinner with Neal and April, Carson realizes that his father is trying to sound like he has been more present in Carson's life, which quickly dissolves into an argument. Carson leaves in anger. During a student council meeting with the principal, Carson opposes a ban on clothing logos. As punishment, the principal revokes all off-campus privileges for students.

During another encounter, Sheryl tells April that she gave her husband everything, and was left with nothing. She says that she was just like April and had a child to keep him, but it didn't work. Carson completes the literary magazine, but it fails. Carson learns that he was accepted into Northwestern, but he never confirmed his admission. He has to reapply. Carson assumes his letter was lost in the mail, but Sheryl admits she threw away his acceptance letter to protect him from the reality that his dreams will never come true.

While Carson and Malerie pack up the unread literary magazines, Carson asks her why she likes to film everything. Malerie tells him about her beliefs about the present being the most important thing, not the past. As Malerie is leaving, she asks Carson if they are friends. He says they are best friends. Carson decides that there is one story left to write; his own. He explains how he realized, despite everything he went through, he did get other students to write for the literary magazine. Now he is truly happy. He leaves, going outside as thunder starts.

It takes over three days for people to find Carson's body. Many people, including the principal and the students who hated him, come to the funeral. It is shown that Carson did leave an impression on everyone he knew. Malerie takes over as president of the writers' club, while Sheryl visits her mother in assisted care.

Cast

Release
The film had its world premiere at the 2012 Tribeca Film Festival on 21 April 2012. The film was released on VOD prior to its theatrical release on 11 January 2013. It was released on DVD and Blu-ray on 21 May 2013.

Critical reception
Struck by Lightning received mixed reviews, holding a Metacritic score of 41, and a Rotten Tomatoes score of 32%. The most common complaint from reviewers was the fact that Colfer's character came off as too arrogant and cynical, and didn't manage to be likeable. Many reviews agreed that the dialogue was witty and funny and that the cast gave strong performances. Many critics also praised Colfer's debut as a screenwriter.

Lisa Schwarzbaum of Entertainment Weekly gave the movie a B−, writing, "After his lofty aspirations to write for The New Yorker are cut painlessly and semi-amusingly short by a freak encounter with lightning, Carson looks back on his so-called life with the gently rueful wisdom that is frequently granted young dead people in flashback tales like this one. The message? Seize the day, kids. There are some real stresses in the fellow's life, many caused by his mess of a drunken single mom (an affecting Allison Janney)."

References

External links
 
 
 

2012 films
2012 comedy-drama films
2012 independent films
2012 LGBT-related films
2010s coming-of-age comedy-drama films
2010s high school films
2010s teen comedy-drama films
American coming-of-age comedy-drama films
American high school films
American independent films
American teen comedy-drama films
American teen LGBT-related films
2010s English-language films
Films scored by Jake Monaco
Films shot in Los Angeles
Gay-related films
LGBT-related comedy-drama films
LGBT-related coming-of-age films
2010s American films